Lance Sergeant William Stephen Kenealy VC, (26 December 1886 – 29 June 1915) was an Irish recipient of the Victoria Cross, the highest and most prestigious award for gallantry in the face of the enemy that can be awarded to British and Commonwealth forces.

Biography
Born in Wexford, his father John was a colour sergeant in the Royal Irish Regiment. When his father retired from the army, the family moved to the district of Ashton-in-Makerfield, Lancashire where his father worked as a check-weigher at Bryn Hall Colliery. Kenealy became a coal miner at age 13.  Ten years later, he enlisted into the army, signing up for 7 years. He joined the 1st Battalion, Lancashire Fusiliers, British Army as a private in during the First World War.

Citation
On 25 April 1915 west of Cape Helles, Gallipoli, Ottoman Turkey, Kenealy was 28 years old when he performed an act of bravery for which he was awarded the Victoria Cross.

Kenealy was one of the six members of the regiment elected by their colleagues in the regiment for the award, and described in the press as "six VC's before breakfast". Lieutenant-General Sir Ian Hamilton, the overall Allied army commander at Gallipoli ordered that the beach be renamed Lancashire Landing because of his conviction that "no finer feat of arms has ever been achieved by the British Soldier – or any other soldier – than the storming of these beaches".

The other five members of the regiment who received the award as a result of the landing were Cuthbert Bromley, John Elisha Grimshaw, Alfred Joseph Richards, Frank Edward Stubbs and Richard Raymond Willis.

Shortly afterwards he was promoted to corporal and then lance-sergeant. He was seriously wounded in the Battle of Gully Ravine on 28 June 1915 and died the next day. Kenealy is buried at Lancashire Landing Cemetery on the Gallipoli Peninsula.

References

Further reading
 The Register of the Victoria Cross (1981, 1988 and 1997)
 
 Ireland's VCs  (Dept of Economic Development, 1995)
 Monuments to Courage (David Harvey, 1999)
 Irish Winners of the Victoria Cross (Richard Doherty & David Truesdale, 2000)

1886 births
1915 deaths
Military personnel from County Wexford
People from County Wexford
People from Ashton-in-Makerfield
Irish Gallipoli campaign recipients of the Victoria Cross
Lancashire Fusiliers soldiers
British military personnel killed in World War I
British Army personnel of World War I
Irish soldiers in the British Army
British Army recipients of the Victoria Cross
British coal miners
Burials at Lancashire Landing Commonwealth War Graves Commission Cemetery